En glad gutt is a 1932 Norwegian drama film directed by John W. Brunius, starring Tore Foss, Hauk Aabel and Gøril Havrevold. The film is based on the story En glad Gut by Bjørnstjerne Bjørnson, published in 1860.

Cast
Tore Foss as Øyvind husmansgutt
Gøril Havrevold as Marit
Hauk Aabel	as Ola Nordistua
Eugen Skjønberg as Øyvind's father
Harald Stormoen as Bård skolemester
Ragnhild Hald as Øyvind's mother
Andreas Bjarke	as Jon Hatlen
Hjørdis Bjarke as En bondejente
Johannes Jensen as Presten

External links
 
 
  

1932 films
1932 drama films
Norwegian drama films
Norwegian black-and-white films
1930s Norwegian-language films